The LSU Tigers basketball and Lady Tigers Basketball Practice Facility is an indoor arena connected to the Pete Maravich Assembly Center through the Northwest portal. The facility features separate, full-size duplicate gymnasiums for the men's and women's basketball teams. Each gym spans  and includes a regulation NCAA court in length with two regulation high school courts in the opposition direction. The courts are exact replicas of the Maravich Center game court and have two portable goals and four retractable goals. Each gymnasium is equipped with a scoreboard, video filming balcony, and scorer's table with video and data connection that enable instant replay. The facility also houses team locker rooms, a team lounge, training rooms, coach's offices and locker rooms, a media room, laundry facility and storage areas.

The building also includes a two-story lobby and staircase that ascends to the second level where a club room holds 500 people for pre-game and post-game events. The club room is connected to the Pete Maravich Assembly Center concourse. The lobby includes team displays and graphics, trophy cases and memorabilia of LSU Basketball. A 900-pound bronze statue of LSU legend Shaquille O'Neal is in front of the facility.

Gallery

References

External links
LSU Basketball practice facility at LSUSports.net

Basketball venues in Baton Rouge, Louisiana
College basketball practice facilities in the United States
College basketball venues in the United States
Indoor arenas in Baton Rouge, Louisiana
LSU Tigers basketball venues
LSU Lady Tigers basketball venues
Sports venues in Louisiana
Sports venues completed in 2010
2010 establishments in Louisiana